Remedios de Escalada is a town in Buenos Aires Province, Argentina. It is the head town of the Tres de Febrero Partido.

External links

Populated places in Buenos Aires Province